Minghua or Ming Hua may refer to:

Places
 Minghua Subdistrict (明桦街道), in Huadian, Jilin
 Mínghua District, in Sunan Yugur Autonomous County
 Mínghai Township, in the eponymous district in Sunan Yugur Autonomous County
  (明化镇), a town in Nangong
 Minghua Village, in Dalin, Chiayi

Other
 Ming Hua Theological College in Hong Kong
 Minghua (ship) (明华), a hotel ship in Shekou, Shenzhen, China (the former MS Ancerville)
 Chi Minghua (池明华, born 1962), Chinese soccer coach

See also
 Ming (disambiguation)
 Hua (disambiguation)